The Church of the Annunciation of Our Lady of the Newarke in Leicester, was a collegiate church founded by Henry of Grosmont, 1st Duke of Lancaster, in 1353. The name "Newarke" is a translation of the Latin "novum opus" i.e. "new work" and was used to distinguish the church from the older collegiate church of Leicester Castle, the Church of St Mary de Castro. Duke Henry enlarged his father's hospital foundation in the southern extension to the castle bailey and built the new church to house a holy relic, part of the Crown of Thorns given him by John II of France. The church became a place of pilgrimage.
Leland visited it around 1540, shortly before its destruction during the Suppression of the Chantries. He described the church as "not very great...but exceeding fair."

Use as a burial place
The church became an important burial place of notable members of the Lancastrian dynasty. Those buried here included:
 Henry, 3rd Earl of Lancaster
 Henry of Grosmont, 1st Duke of Lancaster — son of the above, grandfather of Henry IV of England.
 Constance of Castile, Duchess of Lancaster — second wife of John of Gaunt, daughter of Peter of Castile.
 Mary de Bohun — first wife of Henry IV, who died before he took the throne. She was the mother of Henry V of England.
 Mary Hervey, a member of John of Gaunt's household, who died c.1408, and whose alabaster tomb effigy was moved across the road to the chapel of the Trinity Hospital, where it still stands.

Early sources (the Frowyk Chronicle and the Ballad of Bosworth Field) strongly suggest that the church was where the naked corpse of Richard III of England was displayed after his death at Bosworth Field and prior to his burial in the Greyfriars priory.

Current state

Only two arches survive from the original building, preserved in situ under what is now the Hawthorn Building of De Montfort University, where the public can see them in what is now the university's heritage centre.

See also

Leicester's other museums
Jewry Wall Museum
New Walk Museum
Abbey Pumping Station
Leicester Guildhall
Also, List of museums in Leicestershire

References

14th-century church buildings in England
History of Leicester
Annunciation
Churches in Leicestershire